Lake Bryan is a census-designated place (CDP) in Brazos County, Texas, United States, situated around a reservoir of the same name managed by Bryan Texas Utilities. The population was 2,060 at the 2020 census. It is part of the Bryan–College Station metropolitan area.

Geography
Lake Bryan is located along the northwest border of Brazos County. It is bordered to the southeast by the city of Bryan and to the northwest by Robertson County. U.S. Route 190 forms the northeastern edge of the CDP, leading southeast around Bryan and northwest  to Hearne.

Demographics 

As of the 2020 United States census, there were 2,060 people, 426 households, and 301 families residing in the CDP.

Education
The community is served by Bryan Independent School District (BISD).

Almost all of the CDP is zoned to Kemp Elementary School and Jane Long Middle School, with two parcels in the zones of Navarro Elementary School and Rayburn Intermediate School. Bilingual students zoned to Kemp attend Kemp-Carver Elementary School while bilingual students zoned to Navarro attend Navarro. All of Lake Bryan is zoned to Davila Middle School and Rudder High School.

See also
Lake Bryan, the reservoir

References

Census-designated places in Texas
Bryan–College Station